Stephanie Tency (born 12 December 1990) is a Dutch actress, TV host, model and beauty pageant titleholder who was crowned Miss Universe Netherlands 2013 and represented her country at the Miss Universe 2013 pageant. She stopped her modeling and presenting career the end of 2014 to start her own business called 'Tency Productions'. She makes programs for the Dutch commercial television channel RTL 4.

In 2016 Tency became the assistant of André Hazes Jr. in the gameshow Wheel of Fortune (a.k.a. Rad van Fortuin in Dutch) broadcast by SBS.

Early life
Tency is of Indonesian, German, and Armenian descent. Tency studied fashion styling media. She worked as a model and presenter/actress for the Dutch television. She is also an ambassador for Free a Girl and Energy4All.

Miss Nederland 2013
Miss North Holland, Tency was crowned Miss Nederland 2013 on 10 December 2012 and later represented the Netherlands at Miss Universe 2013 on 9 November 2013 and was placed 18th.

Personal life
According to her Instagram account, Tency currently resides in Amsterdam. On her 30th birthday on 12-12-2020 she announced her engagement to her boyfriend, a Dutch businessman, on Instagram.

References
 http://www.stephanietency.com/

1990 births
Living people
Dutch beauty pageant winners
Miss Universe 2013 contestants
Dutch people of American descent
Dutch people of German descent
Dutch people of Indonesian descent
Dutch people of Armenian descent
Models from Amsterdam
Mass media people from Amsterdam